The Geneseo Shale is a geologic formation in New York. It preserves fossils dating back to the Devonian period. The Geneseo is about 1,000 feet shallower than the deeper-lying Marcellus Shale.

See also

 List of fossiliferous stratigraphic units in New York

References

 

Devonian geology of New York (state)